is a retired Japanese baseball pitcher for the Hanshin Tigers. He was the number three draft pick for the Hanshin Tigers in 1999.

In 2014 and 2015, he was a 2x Central League Middle Reliever.

External links

1976 births
Living people
Baseball people from Hiroshima Prefecture
Toyo University alumni
Japanese baseball players
Nippon Professional Baseball pitchers
Hanshin Tigers players
Japanese baseball coaches
Nippon Professional Baseball coaches